Chris Evert defeated Olga Morozova in the final, 6–0, 6–4 to win the ladies' singles tennis title at the 1974 Wimbledon Championships. It was her first Wimbledon singles title and her second major singles title overall.

Billie Jean King was the two-time defending champion, but lost in the quarterfinals to Morozova.

Seeds

  Billie Jean King (quarterfinals)
  Chris Evert (champion)
  Evonne Goolagong (quarterfinals)
  Rosie Casals (fourth round)
  Virginia Wade (semifinals)
  Kerry Melville (semifinals)
  Nancy Gunter (withdrew)
  Olga Morozova (final)

Nancy Gunter withdrew due to injury. She was replaced in the draw by lucky loser Tine Zwaan.

Qualifying

Draw

Finals

Top half

Section 1

Section 2

Section 3

Section 4

Bottom half

Section 5

Section 6

Section 7

Section 8

References

External links

1974 Wimbledon Championships – Women's draws and results at the International Tennis Federation

Women's Singles
Wimbledon Championship by year – Women's singles
Wimbledon Championships
Wimbledon Championships